Viper of Melody is the sixth studio album, and ninth overall album released by American country musician Wayne Hancock, released on April 21, 2009.

Track listing
All songs written by Wayne Hancock: except where noted 
 "Jump The Blues" - 2:19
 "Driving My Young Life Away" - 1:53
 "Viper of Melody" - 3:07
 "Throwin' Away My Money" - 2:19
 "Your Love and His Blood" - 2:06
 "Working at Working" - 2:59
 "Moving On #3" - 2:29
 "Tropical Blues" - 3:40
 "Dog House Blues" - 3:18
 "High Rolling Train" - 4:04
 "Midnight Stars and You" - 3:22 (James Campbell, Reginald Connelly, Harry Woods)
 "Freight Train Boogie" - 2:02
 "Lonesome Highway" - 3:31

Personnel 

Wayne Hancock – Acoustic Guitar and vocals
Anthony Locke - Steel Guitar
Huckleberry Johnson - Upright Bass
Izak Zaidman - Electric Guitar

See also
2009 in music

References

External links
 Wayne "The Train" Hancock's Official web site  
 [ Wayne Hancock on Allmusic] 
 Wayne Hancock on rockabilly.net 
 Wayne Hancock collection at the Internet Archive's live music archive

Wayne Hancock albums
2009 albums